Bradley Jaden is an English actor. His West End credits include leading roles in Les Misérables and Wicked, and understudying the titular role in Shrek the Musical.

Career
In 2011, Jaden made his West End debut in Shrek the Musical understudying the titular role and playing Papa Bear.

In 2014, he made his Les Mis debut playing Lesgles and understudying Jean Valjean and Enjolras. He would later takeover the role of Enjolras for the show's 30th anniversary.

In 2016, Jaden joined the international tour cast of Wicked playing the role of Fiyero. He later reprised the role in the West End production.

In 2018, Jaden rejoined Les Mis playing the role of Javert. He would be the last actor to play the role in the Queen's Theatre.

He reprised his role of Enjolras in the Gielgud Theatre's Les Misérables: The Staged Concert in 2019. He would then take over the role of Javert from Michael Ball and continue with the role in the Sondheim Theatre production and left the cast in September 2022.

In 2022, Jaden played Sir Lancelot in Camelot opposite Ramin Karimloo and Lucy St. Louis at the London Palladium.

Since January 31, 2023, Jaden has played Jed, who is Sonia Fowler's lodger  in the television soap opera EastEnders.

Acting credits

Theatre 
Source:

References

Living people
English male stage actors
Year of birth missing (living people)